Student television in the United Kingdom is the act of students from universities and colleges around the United Kingdom producing and publishing video content independently, operating in a similar fashion to a small television station. Student television stations exist all around the United Kingdom.

Content is not generally output across traditional media, as a broadcast licence may be prohibitively expensive to small non-profit organisations. Most student television stations use the Internet as a primary method of distributing content; either on a dedicated website, via their university's pages or on video sharing sites such as YouTube. Student television encapsulates a variety of different programming styles and techniques: from large stations funded by their universities who broadcast into student accommodation and buildings, to a single student uploading occasional shows to the web.

Some student stations are affiliated with The National Student Television Association (abbreviated NaSTA), which has forty member stations. The association holds an awards ceremony once a year to reward the best work submitted by the member stations across a number of categories.

History
Some student television stations in the United Kingdom pre-date the founding of national broadcasters like Channel 4 (1982) and Five (1997). Glasgow University Student Television was the first student television station to be founded in the United Kingdom, in 1964. It is the oldest student television station in Europe. Although technically, a station was founded in the United States that predates GUST, this station was staff run for students. This means that GUST is the oldest student-run student television station in the world.  York Student Television followed in 1967, and was the first station to be started in England.

Prior to the advent of digital video technology, particularly editing software, a student television station was costly to run and the programmes were difficult to edit. As digital technology became more available and its cost reduced, it became possible for student societies to move to digital video production.

Cultural impact
Student produced television is becoming increasingly recognised in the United Kingdom, with the National Union of Students having awards for both "Best Media Student" and "Student Broadcaster of the Year", as well as the Royal Television Society's awards for student television stations and student produced content. The Guardian hosts its Student Media Awards annually, offering a "Broadcast Journalist of the year" award.

YSTV from its foundation in 1967 had a twice-weekly news show aimed at students, named Newsround, that pre-dated the BBC show of the same name
In 2006, An animation called Badgered by Sharon Colman who was a student at the National Film and Television School was nominated for an Academy Award for Best Animated Short Film.

In 2011 the short film "The Confession" by Tanel Toom, who was a student at the National Film and television School, was nominated for an Academy Award for Best Short Film.

The National Student Television Association
The National Student Television Association (NaSTA) was believed to be formed in 1970, and comprises over forty affiliated stations from all over the United Kingdom. In late 2016, it was discovered that the Association was formed in 1968.  It runs an annual awards ceremony in which eligible stations submit examples of their programming for appraisal by judges drawn from the wider broadcast industry. The most recent edition was held by QuaysTV, the station run out of The University of Salford. The 2021 Awards will be the second consecutive time QuaysTV have hosted the annual awards. After originally winning the bid in 2019, COVID-19 cancelled the scheduled awards for 2020 and they were later held virtually from MediaCityUK in October of 2020.

The association is currently led by the Chair, Joe Wilmot. Previous people who have chaired the association include Benjamin Kay, Christopher Osborn and Avneet Chauhan.

The earliest evidence of a NaSTA awards ceremony is the late 1970s. GUST still have the trophy that was awarded to the winners and have a video archive with interviews following the win. YSTV possess a "freestyle award" trophy from 1989.  The earliest documented record of a NaSTA conference however dates from the 1995 conference, with eight member stations in attendance. Each year one of the affiliated stations volunteers to be the host station of NaSTA, hosting the awards ceremony and administrating the organisation - this includes the managing of finances, communications and promotion for the entire organisation.

In October 2008, NaSTA launched Freshers TV, a collaboration of over 20 student stations across the United Kingdom providing a television channel to cover freshers' week at universities across the country. This was made available on Freewire, SUBtv and online via the Freshers TV website with the assistance of the JANET network.

The first live FreshersTV show was broadcast in October 2010 by hosts, LSTV, and another in October 2011 by new hosts SUSUtv. 
2012 Host: YSTV, 
2013 Host: LA1:TV from Lancaster. 
2014 Host: Demon TV (DeMontfort University
2015 Host: Forge TV (University of Sheffield)
2016 Host: CUTV (Cardiff Union TV)
2017 Host:Guild TV (University of Birmingham)
2018 Host: Forge TV (University of Sheffield)

2013 saw the addition of the People's Choice Awards to the annual events. The awards differed from the previous awards in that they were voted for entirely by the audience through online voting.
2013 Host: SUSUTV (University of Southampton 
2014 Host: SXTV (University of Essex)
2015 Host: XTV (University of Exeter) 
2016 Host: Rhubarb TV (University of Royal Holloway)

2020's award show was hosted entire online and livestreamed from Salford. The upcoming 2021 Conference and Awards show, scheduled for November 2021, is expected to be an "in person" event, also in Salford.

References

External links
NaSTA

Television organisations in the United Kingdom
British student media groups
 
Student societies in the United Kingdom
Streaming television